Saudi Advanced Industries Company is an industrial investment vehicle of the U.S. Peace Shield defense offset program. The company was formed in 1987, and invests in technology companies in Saudi Arabia. It also holds interests in AlSalam Aircraft Company and the Aircraft Accessories & Components Company, both in Saudi Arabia.

References

External links
 Official website

Companies of Saudi Arabia
Technology companies established in 1987
Companies based in Riyadh
Companies listed on Tadawul
Investment companies of Saudi Arabia
Technology companies of Saudi Arabia
Saudi Arabian companies established in 1987